Sumeg may refer to:
Sümeg, Hungary
Sumeg, alternate name of Shumig, California